Cinema City International N.V. is the largest cinema operator in Central and Eastern Europe as well as in Israel and the third largest cinema operator in all of Europe. The Company operates 99 multiplexes with a total of 966 screens. 

In the CEE countries the Company operates cinemas under the Cinema City brand name and in Israel under the Planet and Rav-Chen brand names. Theatre operations are the Company’s core business comprising the sale of tickets, snacks and beverages in concession stands as well as cinema advertising conducted under its brand name “New Age Media”. The Company is one of the fastest growing cinema chains in Europe with current plans to open 36 new multiplexes (approximately 380 screens) based on existing binding lease agreements. 

The Company is also a film distributor in all its countries of operations. This business is conducted through its local “Forum Film” subsidiaries. The Company conducts real estate activities and owns assets located in Bulgaria, Israel and Poland and include: the Mall of Rousse and other plots of land in Bulgaria, plots of land designated to develop an amusement park in Poland, an indirect interest of 39,78% in Ronson Europe NV and an office building in Herzliya, Israel and 5 other properties in Israel. The Company shares are traded on the Warsaw Stock Exchange. A takeover by Cineworld was announced in January 2014.

History
The Greidinger family, the majority owners of Cinema City International N.V., started their cinema business in Haifa, Israel, Moshe Greidinger (grandfather of the company's current CEO also named Moshe Greidinger) started building his first cinema in 1929, which was opened in 1931 as Ein Dor. In 1935, he opened his second cinema in Haifa, Armon Cinema (palace in Hebrew), a large art-deco building that contained 1,800 seats. Armon Cinema became the heart of Haifa’s entertainment district; due to its large capacity, the cinema was often used for performances by the Israel Philharmonic Orchestra and the Israeli Opera.  

In 1958, the family expanded to Tel Aviv, by acquiring the Chen cinema in  Dizengoff Square. They expanded further by opening additional cinemas in Israel, among them the Armon Cinema in Ramat-Gan in the mid 1960s. In 1967, the family entered the film distribution business when it acquired a company named Forum Film. In 1982 the "Chen" cinema  was turned into the first cinema multiplex in Israel.

International expansion 
In 1997, the international expansion of the business started, Cinema City International N.V. (CCI) was established and opened its first cinema in Budapest, Hungary and by 2005 was the largest multiplex operator in Hungary. In 1999 CCI started in Poland and by 2005 had 12 multiplex theaters there. In 1999, CCI bought the only existing multiplex theater in Prague in the Czech Republic. It also operates multiplex cinemas in Bulgaria, Romania and Slovakia. 

In 2005, CCI opened its distribution office, Forum Hungary in Budapest. The company represents Disney, Spyglass and Revolutionary Releasing in Hungary. In the first 6 months of 2006 it became the second biggest film distribution company in the country.

IPO on the Warsaw Stock Exchange
In December 2006, Cinema City International had an initial public offering on the Warsaw Stock Exchange at a price of 19.30 zloty per share ($6.765), raising $106 million at a company value of $343 million after money. The underwriters of the initial public offering were Bank Austria Creditanstalt and ING Group. The company chose to list on the Warsaw Stock Exchange, since Poland became its major market, representing about 40% of the group's total revenues.

Takeover by Cineworld 
In January 2014, it was announced that Cineworld will buy the entire cinema business of Cinema City for an enterprise value of approximately GBP503 million, to be paid in cash and shares. Cinema City will hold 24.9% of the issued shares of the consolidated Cineworld group. Cinema City will retain its real estate business, which will not be transferred to the combined company.

See also
Cinema of Israel
Economy of Israel
Cinema City Czech Republic
Cinema City Hungary
Cinema City Poland

References

External links 
 
Yes Planet (brand) Official Israeli website
Rav-Chen (brand) Official Israeli website

Cinema chains in Poland
Entertainment companies of the Czech Republic
Entertainment companies of Israel
Entertainment companies of Romania
Entertainment companies established in 1929
Mass media companies of Israel
Israeli brands